A cantiga (cantica, cantar) is a medieval monophonic song, characteristic of the Galician-Portuguese lyric. Over 400 extant cantigas come from the Cantigas de Santa Maria, narrative songs about miracles or hymns in praise of the Holy Virgin. There are near 1700 secular cantigas but music has only survived for a very few: six cantigas de amigo by Martín Codax and seven cantigas de amor by Denis of Portugal.

Cantiga is also the name of a poetic and musical form of the Renaissance, often associated with the villancico and the canción.

See also
Cantigas de Santa Maria
Galician-Portuguese lyric
Martin Codax
Pergaminho Sharrer
Pergaminho Vindel

References 

 Rip Cohen. 500 Cantigas d’Amigo, edição crítica/critical edition. Porto: Campo das Letras, 2003.
 Giulia Lanciani and Giuseppe Tavani (edd.). Dicionário da Literatura Medieval Galega e Portuguesa. Lisbon: Caminho, 1993.
 Manuel Pedro Ferreira. O Som de Martin Codax. Sobre a dimensão musical da lírica galego-portuguesa (séculos XII-XIV). Lisbon: UNISYS/ Imprensa Nacional – Casa de Moeda, 1986.
 Manuel Pedro Ferreira. Cantus Coronatus: 7 Cantigas d’El Rei Dom Dinis. Kassel: Reichenberger, 2005.
Manuel Rodrigues Lapa. Cantigas d’escarnho e de mal dizer dos cancioneiros medievais galego-portugueses, edição crítica. 2nd ed. Vigo: Editorial Galaxia, 1970.
Walter Mettmann. Afonso X, o Sabio. Cantigas de Santa Maria. 4 vols.  Coimbra: Por ordem da Universidade, 1959–72 (rpt. Vigo: Ediçóns Xerais de Galicia, 1981).
Carolina Michaëlis de Vasconcellos. Cancioneiro da Ajuda, edição critica e commentada. 2 vols. Halle a.S.: Max Niemeyer, 1904 (rpt. with Michaëlis 1920, Lisboa: Imprensa Nacional – Casa de Moeda, 1990).
Carolina Michaëlis de Vasconcellos. “Glossário do Cancioneiro da Ajuda”. Revista Lusitana (1920) 23: 1–95.
José Joaquim Nunes. Cantigas d’amor dos trovadores galego-portugueses. Edição crítica acompanhada de introdução, comentário, variantes, e glossário. Coimbra: Imprensa da Universidade, 1932 (rpt. Lisbon: Centro do Livro Brasileiro, 1972).
Jack Sage. "Cantiga", Grove Music Online, ed. L. Macy (accessed September 17, 2006), grovemusic.com (subscription access).
Giuseppe Tavani. Trovadores e Jograis: Introdução à poesia medieval galego-portuguesa. Lisbon: Caminho. 2002.

Song forms
Songs in classical music
Galician-Portuguese lyric
Medieval compositions